Svetlana Chernishova , or Svetlana Chernyshova (born 12 September 1984) is a Russian former competitive figure skater. She won gold at the 2000 ISU Junior Grand Prix in Ukraine and placed ninth at the 2001 World Junior Championships.

Programs

Competitive highlights

References

External links 
 

1984 births
Russian female single skaters
Living people
Figure skaters from Moscow